A blouson or blouse jacket is a jacket that is drawn tight at the waist, causing it to blouse out and hang over the waistband. Originating in military uniforms of the mid-20th century, versions continue to be used as part of military and police uniforms in many places. As a piece of civilian clothing, it is considered to be both sportswear and casual clothing.

History
During World War II, British soldiers wore Battledress uniforms that featured a jacket with an integrated belt to cinch the jacket tightly at the waist. These in turn inspired the creation of the United States Army's M-1944 field jacket, better known after its principal advocate as the Eisenhower jacket.  

The MA-1 bomber jacket was originally designed for the US military during the 1950s. The MA-2 bomber jacket has now taken its place.

The Black jacket was popularized by Yves Saint Laurent and was donned by some music groups in the late 1950s and early 1960s. Modern flight jackets have been popular with skinheads and scooterboys from the 1980s onwards.

In 1993, a blouson was worn as the national costume of the United States for the APEC meeting held in Seattle, Washington. In the early 2000s, the jacket was popular casual wear in hip hop fashion.

Gallery

References

Jackets
Coats (clothing)